South Portland is a sextant of Portland, Oregon and the complement to North Portland, a group of contiguous neighborhoods delimited by geographical boundaries.

The region is bounded on the east by the Willamette River and on the west by Southwest Naito Parkway, Southwest View Point Terrace, and Tryon Creek State Natural Area. South Portland includes approximately 10,000 properties in the Collins View and South Waterfront neighborhoods, as well as portions of the Lewis and Clark College and Oregon Health & Science University campuses.

History
Portland City Council approved the split of South Portland from Southwest Portland on June 6, 2018. City officials began installing updated street signs in May 2020, and older signage will be removed in 2025. The United States Postal Service will be able to use either address system.

References

 
2020 establishments in Oregon